The Chippewa Yacht Club is a private yacht club located in Chippewa Lake, Ohio (United States).

Fleets 
At the present time the club is home of two One-Design racing fleets:
Y flyer Fleet #4 
Snipe Fleet #621

External links 
 Official website

1939 establishments in Ohio
Sailing in Ohio
Yacht clubs in the United States